Keep the Faith is the second album by Black Oak Arkansas released in 1972. The original LP pressings have "gimmick" top-loading cover with 2 fold-out flaps on front that reveals a different photo, lyrics and credits when opened up.

Track listing
All selections written by Black Oak Arkansas.
 "Keep the Faith" - 3:12
 "Revolutionary All American Boys" - 3:35
 "Feet on Earth, Head in Sky" - 4:10  
 "Fever in My Mind" - 2:52
 "The Big One's Still Coming" - 3:57 
 "White Headed Woman" - 4:52 
 "We Live on Day to Day" - 5:16
 "Short Life Line" - 4:52
 "Don't Confuse What You Don't Know" - 4:38

Personnel
Black Oak Arkansas 
Jim "Dandy" Mangrum - lead vocals, washboard
Rickie "Ricochet" Reynolds - 12-string rhythm guitar, vocals
Pat "Dirty" Daugherty - bass guitar, vocals
Harvey "Burley" Jett - lead guitar, banjo, piano, vocals
Stanley "Goober" Knight - lead and steel guitar, organ, vocals
Wayne "Squeezebox" Evans - drums
with:
The Family - backing vocals on "Keep the Faith"

Production
Doc Siegel - technical production 
Tom Dowd - remix engineer
Les Weisbrich - art direction, photography

Charts
Album - Billboard (United States)

References

1972 albums
Black Oak Arkansas albums
Atco Records albums